Suqtaqucha (Quechua suqta six, qucha lake, "six lakes", hispanicized spelling Soctaccocha) is the name of a group of lakes in Peru. They are situated in the Apurímac Region, Andahuaylas Province, Kishuara District.

See also
 Antaqucha
List of lakes in Peru
 Quriqucha
 Wachuqucha

References

Lakes of Peru
Lakes of Apurímac Region